Brit Awards 1993  was the 13th edition of the Brit Awards, an annual pop music award ceremony in the United Kingdom. They are run by the British Phonographic Industry and took place on 16 February 1993 at Alexandra Palace in London.

Performances
 Andy Bell and k.d. lang – "No More Tears (Enough Is Enough)"
 Madness – "Night Boat to Cairo"
 Peter Gabriel – "Steam"
 Rod Stewart – "Ruby Tuesday"
 Simply Red – "Wonderland"
 Suede – "Animal Nitrate"
 Tasmin Archer – "Sleeping Satellite"

Winners and nominees

Multiple nominations and awards
The following artists received multiple awards and/or nominations. don't counting Most Successful Live Act.

References

External links
Brit Awards 1993 at Brits.co.uk

Brit Awards
BRIT Awards
BRIT Awards
Brit Awards
Brit
Brit Awards